Cypraedia is an extinct genus of gastropods.

See also 
 List of marine gastropod genera in the fossil record

References 

  J. L. M. Defrance. 1826. Conchyliologie et Malacologie. Dictionnaire des Sciences Naturelles 10, pages 1–36

External links 

 
 

Pediculariinae
Prehistoric mollusc genera
Gastropod genera